Peter Mutter is a former Canadian international lawn bowler.

Bowls career
Mutter has represented Canada at two Commonwealth Games at the 1990 Commonwealth Games and the 1994 Commonwealth Games.

He won three medals at the Asia Pacific Bowls Championships.

References

Canadian male bowls players
Living people
Bowls players at the 1990 Commonwealth Games
Bowls players at the 1994 Commonwealth Games
Year of birth missing (living people)